Shufu County, also transliterated from Uyghur as Konaxahar County or Konasheher County/Kona Sheher County, is a county in Kashgar Prefecture, Xinjiang Uyghur Autonomous Region, China. According to the 2002 census, it has a population of 360,000.

According to a list obtained and partially verified by the Associated Press, Shufu county has the highest imprisonment rate of any location in the world.

Name
The names of "Shufu County" and nearby "Shule County", transliterations of local language names from Han Dynasty corresponds to its Uyghur names, "Kona Xahar" (meaning 'old city') and "Yengi Xahar" (New City) respectively. The names for the two counties in both languages may share their origins in languages of the Saka people, residents of Kashgar area before its linguistic Turkification in as late as the 11th century.

History
The county was established in 1882.

In 2013, Awat Township (Awati; ئاۋات يېزىسى / 阿瓦提乡) and Yëngi’östeng Township (Yingwusitan; يېڭىئۆستەڭ يېزىسى / 英吾斯坦乡) were transferred to Kashgar city.

On December 15, 2013, 16 people were killed in an attack on a police station. A group, armed with knives and bombs, attacked the police station and killed two police officers. In the aftermath 14 of the 16 attackers were killed by police special units.

On April 28, 2014, Chinese Communist Party General Secretary and President Xi Jinping visited Tokkuzak (Tuokezhake) during his inspection tour of Xinjiang.

On October 21, 2014, Aqqash Township (Akekashi) was transferred from Konaxahar (Shufu) County to Kashgar city.

In 2017, Erkin Ayup, brother of Abduweli Ayup, who had recently been promoted as head of oversight for the Organization Department of the Committee of the Chinese Communist Party in his hometown of Tokkuzak (Tuokezhake), went missing. In an interview conducted by Radio Free Asia, a staffer at his former office said he had been sent to the re-education camp near Kashgar Airport.

On January 12, 2019, an 5.1 magnitude earthquake struck the county. There were no reports of casualties or damage.

In interviews with Radio Free Asia in 2020, residents and officials of the county stated that it was no longer possible to perform traditional Uyghur nikah marriage rites in the county.

Administrative divisions

Towns ( / )
Tokkuzak (Tuokezhake, Toqquzaq;  / ), Lengger (Langan;  / ), Oghusaq (Wukusake;  / ), Opal (Wupa'er;  / ) 
	
Townships ( / )
 Tashmiliq Township (Tashimilike;  / ), Tërim Township (Tierimu;  / ), Bulaqsu Township (Bulakesu;  / ), Saybag Township (Sayibage, Saybagh;  / ), Zemin Township (Zhanmin;  / ), Mush Township (Mushi;  / )

Others
 County Livestock Farm 县种畜场, County Gardening Farm 县园艺场, County Forest 县林场, County Seed Farm 县良种场, Shufu Guangzhou Industrial City 疏附广州工业城

Economy
The county is an important area for wheat, corn, sorghum, cotton, and rice production in southern Xinjiang, as well as producing apricots, grapes, pomegranates, muskmelon, pistachio and other fruits. Industries include cotton spinning, food, cotton ginning and others.

Demographics

As of 2015, 271,556 of the 277,877 residents of the county were Uyghur, 5,406 were Han Chinese and 915 were from other ethnic groups.

As of 1999, 94.69% of the population of Konaxahar (Shufu) County was Uyghur and 5.02% of the population was Han Chinese.

Transportation
 China National Highway 314

Notable persons
 Abdur Rahman Kashgari
 Ismail Tiliwaldi

Gallery

References

County-level divisions of Xinjiang
Kashgar Prefecture